Rathmullen Wood is a national nature reserve of approximately  located in County Donegal, Ireland. It is managed by the Irish National Parks & Wildlife Service.

Features
Rathmullen Wood (also spelt Rathmullan Wood) was legally protected as a national nature reserve by the Irish government in 1986. The reserve is also a candidate for a Special Area of Conservation.

The wood is a high quality example of an old Irish sessile oak woodland. The woods also feature downy birch, hazel and holly. The large birch trees are a non-native species, and thus do not support the same level of biodiversity as the rest of the woods, and it is actively managed to stop it out-competing the native tree species. Flora on the reserve include bilberry, bluebells, bugle, hard fern, wild garlic, and woodrush. Among the birds which inhabit the woods are buzzards, jays, ravens, sparrowhawks, tree-creepers and woodcock. Badgers, deer, otters, and foxes have also been recorded on the site. The site has a 1km looped trail.

References

Geography of County Donegal
Forests and woodlands of the Republic of Ireland
Nature reserves in the Republic of Ireland
Tourist attractions in County Donegal